Andriy Vasylyshyn (born 24 April 1933) is a Ukrainian militsiya general. He was the first interior minister of the independent Ukraine.

Early life and education
Vasylyshyn was born on 24 April 1933 in peasant family of kolkhoz in village of Vesnyanka, Starokostiantyniv Raion, Vinnytsia Oblast (today in Khmelnytskyi Oblast), historical region of Volhynia. In 1950 he finished a training center of Ministry of Soviet Farms of the Soviet Union.

Career
Vasylyshyn is the former army general and held the rank of lieutenant general. He was appointed interior minister to the cabinet led by Prime Minister Vitold Fokin following the fall of the communist regime in 1991. He was reappointed to the post in the cabinet led by Prime Minister Leonid Kuchma in October 1992. He was dismissed by the Prime Minister in July 1994. He was replaced by Volodymyr Radchenko in the post.

He is the president of the International Police Association Ukrainian section and an advisor to the Ukraine's ministry of interior.

References

External links
 Andriy Vasylyshyn at Sword and Shield

1933 births
Living people
People from Khmelnytskyi Oblast
Taras Shevchenko National University of Kyiv alumni
Generals of the Internal Service (Ukraine)
Soviet interior ministers of Ukraine
Interior ministers of Ukraine
Recipients of the Order of Merit (Ukraine), 3rd class
Chernobyl liquidators
Recipients of the Honorary Diploma of the Cabinet of Ministers of Ukraine